Podocarpus sylvestris is a species of conifer in the family Podocarpaceae. It is found only in New Caledonia.

References

sylvestris
Least concern plants
Taxonomy articles created by Polbot